Antonio Pesenti (17 May 1908 – 10 June 1968) was an Italian professional road racing cyclist. The highlight of his career was his overall win in the 1932 Giro d'Italia. He also placed third and fourth overall in the 1931 and 1932 Tour de France, respectively.

Major results

1930
 5th Overall Giro d'Italia
1st Stage 13
1931
 3rd Overall Tour de France
 7th Overall Giro d'Italia
 10th Giro di Lombardia
1932
 1st  Overall Giro d'Italia
1st Stage 7
 4th Overall Tour de France
1st Stage 5
 8th Milan–San Remo
1935
 6th Giro del Veneto

References

1908 births
1968 deaths
Cyclists from the Province of Bergamo
Italian male cyclists
Giro d'Italia winners
Italian Giro d'Italia stage winners
Italian Tour de France stage winners